It Was Easy is the debut album by Title Tracks, the solo project from the Washington, D.C.-based musician, John Davis.  It was released on February 23, 2010 in digital formats by The Ernest Jenning Record Co. and in the LP format by Safety Meeting Records.  It was recorded in January 2009 at Brookland Studios, Silver Sonya Studios and The National Crayon Museum.  Davis performed all of the vocals and instruments on the record except for Kriston Capps (saxophone on "No, Girl") and Tracyanne Campbell (vocals on "No, Girl" and "Tougher Than The Rest").  The album contains nine songs by Davis and two covers (Bruce Springsteen's "Tougher Than the Rest" and The Byrds' "She Don't Care About Time.")

Track listing
All Songs Written by John Davis unless noted otherwise
"Every Little Bit Hurts" – 3:18
"No, Girl" – 3:31
"Black Bubblegum" – 3:06
"Piles of Paper" – 3:01
"Hello There" – 3:43
"Tougher Than the Rest" (Bruce Springsteen) – 2:36
"Steady Love" – 2:50
"It Was Easy" – 2:18
"At Fifteen" – 2:34
"Found Out" – 2:35
"She Don't Care About Time" (Gene Clark) – 2:48
 

Title Tracks albums
2010 debut albums